Bernardo Samper García del Diestro (born April 8, 1982 in Bogotá), known as Bernardo Samper, is a professional male squash player who represented Colombia. He reached a career-high world ranking of World No. 57 in November 2007 after having joined the Professional Squash Association (PSA) in 2000.

References

External links 
 
 

1982 births
Living people
Colombian male squash players
Trinity Bantams men's squash players
Sportspeople from Bogotá
Squash players at the 2007 Pan American Games
Pan American Games gold medalists for Colombia
Pan American Games medalists in squash
South American Games gold medalists for Colombia
South American Games bronze medalists for Colombia
South American Games medalists in squash
Competitors at the 2010 South American Games
Medalists at the 2007 Pan American Games
21st-century Colombian people